Songs is the second album by the Belgian rock band Admiral Freebee, released in 2005.

Track listing
(All songs written by Tom Van Laere)
 "The Worst is Yet to Come" – 4:53
 "Lucky One" – 4:11
 "Recipe for Disaster"  – 3:29
 "Sad Rebel" – 3:57
 "Boy You Never Found" – 4:06
 "Oh Darkness" – 3:37
 "Hope Alone" – 2:51
 "Carry On" – 4:05
 "Waiting for Nothing" – 3:45
 "Murder of the Sun" – 4:30
 "Afterglow" – 4:04
 "Framing the Agony" – 2:25
 "Baby's Chest" – 3:47

Admiral Freebee albums
2005 albums